The Guanajuato Open is a tournament for professional female tennis players played on outdoor hardcourts. The event is classified as a $60,000+H ITF Women's World Tennis Tour tournament and has been held in Irapuato, Mexico, since 2007.

Past finals

Singles

Doubles

External links 
 ITF search 
 Official website

ITF Women's World Tennis Tour
Hard court tennis tournaments
Tennis tournaments in Mexico
2007 establishments in Mexico
Recurring sporting events established in 2007